SARIA Bio-Industries AG & Co. KG is a company group based in Selm (Westphalia / Germany) and active throughout Europe. The company acts as a service provider for agricultural and food sectors (with emphasis on recycling waste from meat and food industries), as a producer of new forms of energy, and as a manufacturer of products for human consumption, pet food, aquaculture, oleochemistry and agriculture. SARIA is one of the largest companies of its kind in Europe and is owned by family-run Rethmann Group.

History
RETHMANN first became active in the field of recycling animal by-products when it took over the firm "Gebr. Schaap" in Marl, Germany in 1977. SARIA Bio-Industries AG & Co. KG was then founded in 1998 as an independent division of the RETHMANN Group. The new company united all of the Group's activities within the product and service segments that had previously been run by a number of companies including RETHMANN TBA GmbH & Co. KG.

Processing plants were already being operated at the time of the company's foundation in:
 Germany (7 plants)
 Austria (1 plant)
 Czech Republic (1 plant)
 France (10 plants, previously Soporga and SFM)
 Spain (1 plant)
 Poland (1 plant)

Since 1998, the company has been steadily growing in size by expanding into new areas, extending existing processing plants, and by taking over existing companies operating in the same sector of business. A milestone in the company's history was, for example, when it put Germany's first ever plant into operation in 2001 to produce biodiesel from animal fat. This plant is located in Malchin, Germany. Further plants have followed, with vegetable oils now also being used to produce biofuels.

De Mulder Group Acquisition
In 2011 the group acquired a controlling 51% interest in Prosper De Mulder Group, the UK's largest company associated with animal by-products. Members of the founder's family controlled the remaining share. In February 2016, SARIA purchased the remaining 49% of shares from the De Mulder Family.

Company structure
SARIA's individual national controlling companies operate under the umbrella of SARIA Bio-Industries AG & Co. KG, which is based in Selm, Germany. SARIA is active in the following countries:

Germany
 France
 Poland 
 Czech Republic 
 Spain
 Austria
 Hungary
 Belarus 
 Lithuania 
 Russia 
 United Kingdom

Locations 
Around 11,000 employees work at the company's approx. 200 sites which are located in 26 countries worldwide.

References

Bioenergy companies
Companies based in North Rhine-Westphalia
Food and drink companies of Germany
Waste management companies of Germany